The slendertail lanternshark or Moller's lanternshark (Etmopterus molleri) is a shark of the family Etmopteridae found in the western Indian Ocean between latitudes 34°N and 46°S at depths between 250 and 860 m.  It can grow up to 46 cm in length.

Reproduction is presumed to be ovoviviparous.

In June 2018 the New Zealand Department of Conservation classified the slendertail lanternshark as "Data Deficient" with the qualifier "Uncertain whether Secure Overseas" under the New Zealand Threat Classification System.

Bioluminescence 
The slendertail lantern shark, like other members of Etmopteridae, are bioluminescent due to photophores arranged on its body. These shark's photophores produce blue light with a peak emission spectra around 477 nm.

References

Etmopterus
Taxa named by Gilbert Percy Whitley
Fish described in 1939